Psalm 58 is the 58th psalm of the Book of Psalms, beginning in English in the King James Version: "Do ye indeed speak righteousness, O congregation?". In the slightly different numbering system of the Greek Septuagint version of the Bible and the Latin Vulgate, this psalm is Psalm 57. In Latin, it is known as In finem ne disperdas David.

It is one of six psalms labeled a michtam, which may mean an "engraving", "sculpture", "golden", or "secret". It is also classified as one of the Imprecatory Psalms. Psalm 58 is a companion piece to Psalm 57, which also describes David's difficult relationship with Saul, and both psalms refer in their headings to Altaschith or "Do Not Destroy", possibly an ancient song whose tune was to be used in singing the psalms.

The psalm forms a regular part of Jewish, Catholic, Lutheran, Anglican and other Protestant liturgies. It has been set to music.

Themes 
The Midrash Tehillim connects the words Al taschet (do not destroy) in the Hebrew verse 1 to the episode when David took Abishai into Saul's camp and had the opportunity to kill Saul as he slept. David said, "Al tashhitahu (do not destroy him", which echoes these words, setting Saul's animosity toward David as the theme of this psalm. The psalm also alludes to Abner, the chief of Saul's army, who would not admit to David's righteousness when David refrained from killing Saul in the cave. Henry suggests that David composed Psalm 58 after Saul used the force of law to brand David as a traitor to the crown.
 
David exhorts at length against either wicked people or wicked judges, the latter possibly referring to those who sided with Saul. David uses highly descriptive language comparing the wicked to snakes, serpents, cobras, and lions, and prays to God to "smash their teeth in their mouth, shatter the molars of young lions…His arrows, may they be as if crumbled to pieces".

Quoting Jerome, George Haydock avers that the depiction of the wicked judges refers "to the proceedings of the Jews against Christ", and adds that the psalm decries "hypocrites" and "detractors".

Text

Hebrew Bible version 
Following is the Hebrew text of Psalm 58:

King James Version
 To the chief Musician, Altaschith, Michtam of David. 
 Do ye indeed speak righteousness, O congregation? do ye judge uprightly, O ye sons of men? 
 Yea, in heart ye work wickedness; ye weigh the violence of your hands in the earth. 
 The wicked are estranged from the womb: they go astray as soon as they be born, speaking lies. 
 Their poison is like the poison of a serpent: they are like the deaf adder that stoppeth her ear; 
 Which will not hearken to the voice of charmers,´charming never so wisely. 
 Break their teeth, O God, in their mouth: break out the great teeth of the young lions, O LORD. 
 Let them melt away as waters which run continually: when he bendeth his bow to shoot his arrows, let them be as cut in pieces. 
 As a snail which melteth, let every one of them pass away: like the untimely birth of a woman, that they may not see the sun. 
 Before your pots can feel the thorns, he shall take them away as with a whirlwind, both living, and in his wrath.
 The righteous shall rejoice when he seeth the vengeance: he shall wash his feet in the blood of the wicked. 
 So that a man shall say, Verily there is a reward for the righteous: verily he is a God that judgeth in the earth.</poem>

Uses

Judaism 
Verse 9 in the Hebrew is said by the snail in Perek Shirah.

The entire chapter is recited as protection from an aggressive dog.

Catholic Church 
From the early Middle Ages monasteries used this psalm at the Matins office on Tuesday, according to the Rule of St. Benedict of Nursia which was established around 530.

In the revision of the Liturgy of the Hours following the Second Vatican Council, this psalm was deemed unsuitable for continued use in the Office, and is therefore omitted from the 1971 Liturgy of the Hours.

Omission in various lectionaries 
Because this is an imprecatory Psalm, the 1962 Canadian Book of Common Prayer leaves out Psalm 58 (and Psalm 137). A number of various other imprecatory Psalms are omitted from a number of lectionaries usually having Psalm 58 among those redacted. Evangelicals tend to disagree and see a value in these passages.

Musical settings 
Heinrich Schütz set Psalm 58 in a metred version in German, "Wie nun, ihr Herren, seid ihr stumm", SWV 155, as part of the Becker Psalter, first published in 1628.

References

External links 

 
 
 Text of Psalm 58 according to the 1928 Psalter
 Psalms Chapter 58 text in Hebrew and English, mechon-mamre.org
 For the leader. Do not destroy. A miktam of David / Do you indeed pronounce justice, O gods text and footnotes, usccb.org United States Conference of Catholic Bishops
 Psalm 58:1 introduction and text, biblestudytools.com
 Psalm 58 enduringword.com
 Psalm 58 / Refrain: The Lord makes himself known by his acts of justice. Church of England
 Psalm 58 at biblegateway.com
 Hymns for Psalm 58 hymnary.org
 Nova Vulgata version of Psalm 58(57)

058
Works attributed to David